Alan Turing: The Enigma (1983) is a biography of the British mathematician, codebreaker, and early computer scientist, Alan Turing (1912–1954) by Andrew Hodges. The book covers Alan Turing's life and work. The 2014 film The Imitation Game is loosely based on the book, with dramatization.

Editions
The following editions of the book exist:

Hardback
 UK: Burnett Books/Hutchinson (1983)
 US: Simon & Schuster (1983)

Paperback
 UK: Counterpoint (Alan Turing: The Enigma of Intelligence, without photographs)  
 US: Touchstone Books
 UK: Vintage Books (1992–2012, including the 2012 centenary edition)
 US: Walker Books (2000–2005)
 US: Princeton University Press (2014)

New editions appeared in 2012, for the centenary of Turing's birth, and 2014, the year the film The Imitation Game was released.

Audio
 Audible.co.uk (30-hour recording)

Reviews
The book has been widely reviewed by newspapers and magazines including The Guardian, The Independent, Los Angeles Times, Nature, New Statesman, New Yorker, The New York Times, Notices of the American Mathematical Society, Physics Today, Sunday Times, Time Out, Times Literary Supplement, The Wall Street Journal.

Influence
The book inspired the 2014 film The Imitation Game, directed by Morten Tyldum and starring Benedict Cumberbatch and Keira Knightley.

See also
 The Annotated Turing (2008)
 The Turing Guide (2017)

References

External links
Alan Turing: The Enigma website

1983 non-fiction books
Biographies and autobiographies of mathematicians
Books about scientists
Biographies adapted into films
British biographies
Hutchinson (publisher) books
Simon & Schuster books
Cultural depictions of Alan Turing